Yevgeny Dmitriyevich Zemko (born 16 February 1996) is a Belarusian professional footballer who plays for Slavia Mozyr. Besides Belarus, he has played in Russia.

References

External links 
 
 

1996 births
Sportspeople from Vitebsk
Living people
Belarusian footballers
Association football midfielders
FC Vitebsk players
FC Orsha players
FC Granit Mikashevichi players
FC Naftan Novopolotsk players
FC Slavia Mozyr players
Belarusian expatriate footballers
Expatriate footballers in Russia